Segezha is a town in the Republic of Karelia, Russia.

Segezha may also refer to:
Segezha (Karelia), a river in the Republic of Karelia, Russia, which flows into Lake Vygozero
Segezha (Leningrad Oblast), a river in Leningrad Oblast, Russia, a tributary of the Svir